Yedidia, Yedidya, Yedidiah, etc. is both a given name and a surname, a variant of Jedediah.

The Hebrew name of the  Hellenistic Jewish philosopher Philo of Alexandria
Yedidia Be'eri (1931–2004), Israeli politician
Yedidia Shofet (1908–2005), Iranian rabbi
Yedidya Ya'ari (born 1947) Former commander of the Israeli Navy
Yedidya Eisenshtat, Israeli architect, author of the Anzac Memorial (Israel)

See also

Kfar Yedidia, a moshav named after Philo of Alexandria

Hebrew-language names